The Smile may refer to:

 The Smile (band), an English rock band
 "The Smile" (Homeland), a 2012 episode of the series
 The Smile (film), a 1994 French drama
 The Smile (novel), by Donna Jo Napoli, 2008

See also
 
 
 Smile (disambiguation)